Gonolobus campii is a species of plant in the family Apocynaceae. It is endemic to Ecuador.  It is threatened by habitat loss.

References

campii
Endemic flora of Ecuador
Endangered plants
Taxonomy articles created by Polbot